The manga series Kuroko's Basketball is written and illustrated by Tadatoshi Fujimaki. It has been published in Shueisha shōnen magazine Weekly Shōnen Jump since 2008 and concluded on its 40th issue on September 1, 2014. The individual chapters are published in tankōbon by Shueisha. The first volume published on April 3, 2009, and as of December 4, 2014, all 30 volumes have been released with the 30th and final volume released on that date. A sequel was released on December 29, 2014, on the magazines Jump Next imprint.  Viz Media has licensed the manga for North American and will publish the manga in 2-in-1 editions beginning in 2016.

The manga was adapted into an anime series by Production I.G, which aired on Mainichi Broadcasting System, with the first episode shown on April 7, 2012. The series ran for three seasons.


Volumes list

References

Kuroko no Basuke
C